For the Canadian filmmaker, see Evan Johnson (filmmaker).

Evan Johnson (born August 21, 1994) is a professional Canadian football offensive lineman for the Saskatchewan Roughriders of the Canadian Football League (CFL). He played college football for the Saskatchewan Huskies from 2013 to 2016.

Professional career

Ottawa Redblacks
Johnson was drafted by the Ottawa Redblacks in the first round with the ninth overall pick in the 2017 CFL Draft and signed with the team on May 24, 2017. He dressed for his first professional regular season game on June 23, 2017 in the Redblacks' season opener in a tie against the Calgary Stampeders. He played in his first playoff game in the 2017 East Semi-Final loss to the Saskatchewan Roughriders. In 2018, he played in 16 regular season games and played in the 106th Grey Cup game where the Redblacks lost to the Stampeders. Overall, he played in three seasons for Ottawa where he dressed in 52 regular season games. He did not play in 2020 due to the cancellation of the 2020 CFL season.

Saskatchewan Roughriders
On the first day of free agency in 2021, Johnson signed with the Saskatchewan Roughriders on February 9, 2021.

References

External links
Saskatchewan Roughriders bio

Living people
1994 births
Players of Canadian football from Saskatchewan
Sportspeople from Regina, Saskatchewan
Canadian football offensive linemen
Saskatchewan Huskies football players
Saskatchewan Roughriders players
Ottawa Redblacks players